Lleyton Hewitt and Sandon Stolle were the defending champions but only Stolle competed that year with Max Mirnyi.

Mirnyi and Stolle lost in the quarterfinals to Mark Knowles and Brian MacPhie.

Knowles and MacPhie won in the final 7–6(7–5), 5–7, 6–4 against Mahesh Bhupathi and Sébastien Lareau.

Seeds
The top four seeded teams received byes into the second round.

Draw

Finals

Top half

Bottom half

External links
 2001 RCA Championships Doubles draw

RCA Championships - Doubles
2001 RCA Championships